Achilleas Angelopoulos (born 31 March 1977) is a Greek centre back who plays for Ethnikos Gazoros F.C. in the Greek Gamma Ethniki.

Career
Born in Trikala, Angelopoulos began his professional football career by joining local side Trikala F.C. in February 1995. He later played for Kallithea F.C. and Panthrakikos F.C. in the Greek Super League.

References

External links
Profile at Onsports.gr

1977 births
Living people
Greek footballers
Trikala F.C. players
Kallithea F.C. players
Panthrakikos F.C. players
Pierikos F.C. players
Association football defenders
Footballers from Trikala